Jaqueline Anastácio (born 9 November 1987) is a Brazilian handball player for BM Remudas and the Brazilian national team.

She has earlier played for Universidade Metodista, Siófok KC, Gjøvik HK, Dinamo Volgograd, Ringkøbing Håndbold, SG BBM Bietigheim, Kastamonu BSK, Polatlı BSK, and Maccabi Srugo Rishon Lezion. She competed for Brazil at the 2009 World Women's Handball Championship in China. She was selected to represent Brazil at the 2019 World Women's Handball Championship in Japan.

References

External links

1987 births
Living people
Sportspeople from Minas Gerais
Brazilian female handball players
Pan American Games medalists in handball
Pan American Games gold medalists for Brazil
Handball players at the 2015 Pan American Games
Expatriate handball players in Turkey
Brazilian expatriate sportspeople in Denmark
Brazilian expatriate sportspeople in Germany
Brazilian expatriate sportspeople in Hungary
Brazilian expatriate sportspeople in Israel
Brazilian expatriate sportspeople in Norway
Brazilian expatriate sportspeople in Romania
Brazilian expatriate sportspeople in Russia
Brazilian expatriate sportspeople in Turkey
Siófok KC players
Medalists at the 2015 Pan American Games
21st-century Brazilian women